Faten Kallel  (Arabic : فاتن قلال), is a Tunisian politician who serves as the Secretary of State, Ministry of Youth and Sports since 27 August 2016. She is a member of the political party Afek Tounes.

Education 
Faten Kallel holds a master's degree in accounting from IHEC Carthage and an MBA from the University of Paris-Dauphine.

Professional and political career 
Faten is a management consultant. She worked for several consulting firms in Tunisia such as Grant Thornton and Deloitte. Then, she joined the Ministry of Development, Investment and International Cooperation in February 2015 and she worked as a responsible for the organization and administrative reforms. After that, Faten joined the program  Smart Tunisia.

On August 20, 2016, and after the appointment of Youssef Chahed as Head of Government, she was appointed Secretary of State to the Ministry of Youth and Sports as a responsible for Youth.

Kallel was named early 2017 by the World Economic Forum as a Young Global Leaders.

References 

Tunisian politicians
People from Sousse
Afek Tounes politicians
Carthage High Commercial Studies Institute alumni
Paris Dauphine University alumni
Living people
Year of birth missing (living people)